is a Japanese stage and screen actor. Internationally, he is best known for his roles as Koichi Takagi in the Monday films, Tetsuya Ishigami in the Suspect X films, and Jo Sawashiro in Yakuza: Like a Dragon. In Japan, he is best known for his roles as  Ōsuke Nakahara in Yamato Nadeshiko of drama series, and Norifumi Suzuki in Always: Sunset on Third Street films. He won the Japanese Academy Award for Best Supporting Actor in 2005 for Always: Sunset on Third Street. In 2013, he was nominated for an International Emmy Award for best actor for his role in Yasu – A Single Father’s Story.

Life and career 
Tsutsumi was born in Hyōgo. He began training at the age of 18 with Shinichi "Sonny" Chiba's Japan Action Club. When he was at Japan Action Club (JAC), he had been the manager of Hiroyuki Sanada for several years. In 2013, he was nominated for an International Emmy Award for best actor for his role in Yasu – A Single Father’s Story.

Filmography

Films

TV series

Theatre

Video games

Commercials

Awards and nominations

References

External links

Official Profile
Shinichi Tsutsumi Official website

1964 births
Living people
Actors from Hyōgo Prefecture
Japanese male film actors
Japanese male television actors
People from Nishinomiya
20th-century Japanese male actors
21st-century Japanese male actors